"Gravity of Love" is a song by the musical group Enigma. It was released in November 1999 as the lead single from the album The Screen Behind the Mirror.

The song features guest vocals by Ruth-Ann Boyle of the British band Olive and has samples from Carl Orff's Carmina Burana. The beat in the song originally came from Led Zeppelin's rendition of "When the Levee Breaks", which was also used in the song "Return to Innocence".

Music video
In the music video for the song, which is set in the 1930s, a masquerade ball is being held in a mansion, while passion starts to run high for some of the participants. The video was filmed on location in the Villa Wagner I (designed by the famous architect Otto Wagner) in Penzing, a district in Vienna, Austria. The director for the video is Thomas Job.
The setting is reminiscent of the 1961 film L'année dernière à Marienbad and some scenes from Stanley Kubrick's 1999 film Eyes Wide Shut.

Track listing
 "Radio Edit" – 3:58
 "Judgement Day Club Mix" 6:12 (Remixed Peter Ries and TAAW)
 "Dark Vocal Club Mix" – 6:36 (Remixed by W. Filz for La Danza Production)

Other Versions
 "Chilled Club Mix" – 5:27 available on 2- and 3-track CD Single "Turn Around"

Charts

References

Enigma (German band) songs
1999 singles
Songs written by Michael Cretu
1999 songs
Virgin Records singles